Ironus elegans is a species of freshwater nematodes. It is described from Sicily.

References 

Enoplia
Nematodes described in 1979
Freshwater animals
Fauna of Sicily